Tyler Oakes (born November 8, 1986) is an American college baseball coach, head coach of the NCAA Division I Summit League's North Dakota State Bison. He was the pitching coach, recruiting coordinator and associate head coach at North Dakota State from 2014 to 2021. Prior to North Dakota State, Oakes was an assistant for South Dakota State and Minnesota.

Playing career
Tyler Oakes played four years of college baseball at Minnesota from 2006 to 2009 before being signed as an undrafted free agent by the Tampa Bay Rays. Oakes played one season in the Appalachian League for the Princeton Rays in 2009 before retiring from professional baseball.

Coaching career
On June 22, 2021, North Dakota State announced that Oakes would become the 22nd head coach in the team's history after Tod Brown departed to take the head coaching job at New Mexico.
On May 20, 2022, North Dakota State clinched their first Summit League regular season title under Oakes' leadership. For that leadership he received the 2022 Summit League Coach of the Year award. In Oakes' first Summit League Tournament as head coach; the Bison went 1-2, losing to Omaha twice and beating South Dakota State in their lone win.

Head coaching record

References

1986 births
Living people
Baseball pitchers
Minnesota Golden Gophers baseball players
North Dakota State Bison baseball coaches
Princeton Rays players
South Dakota State Jackrabbits baseball coaches
Baseball players from Minnesota
South Dakota State University alumni
People from Jordan, Minnesota
Baseball coaches from Minnesota